Dale A. Whitman is the former James E. Campbell  Professor of Law at the  University of Missouri in  Columbia,  MO, where he retired in 2007.  He received his  B.E.S. degree in electrical engineering from Brigham Young University (BYU) in 1963 and his LL.B. law degree from Duke University in 1966.  After practising for a short period with the  firm of O'Melveny & Myers, LLP in Los Angeles,  CA, Mr. Whitman began his  academic career at the  University of North Carolina.

Prof. Whitman's principal  fields of interest are  property and real estate finance.  He is a  co-author of five books and numerous  articles in these areas.  

In 1973, Whitman was among the founding  faculty of the  Brigham Young University Law School.  

Whitman taught at BYU and then moved to the University of Missouri (MU) after a visiting professorship there in 1976. He went on to teach at the University of Washington in 1978, where he also served as associate dean before returning to MU in 1982 to become the law school's dean (1982 - 1988). Whitman specializes in property law, and he was the reporter for the Uniform Non-Judicial Foreclosure Act, approved in 2002. In that same year, he also served as president of the Association of American Law Schools.

Whitman retired from MU in the summer of 2007, taught at Washington University and the University of Florida during the 2007-08 academic year.  Whitman was a visiting professor at the University of Arkansas School of Law and currently teaches at Arizona State University Sandra Day O'Connor School of Law beginning in 2019.

References

External links 
 Uniform Non-Judicial Foreclosure Act

1939 births
Brigham Young University alumni
Duke University alumni
Washington University in St. Louis faculty
Living people
University of Missouri School of Law faculty
University of North Carolina faculty